The Nature of Maps is the fourth album from Matt Pond PA, released in 2002.

Track listing
 "Fairlee " – 3:16
 "No More" – 4:13
 "The Party" – 4:17
 "Closer" – 4:37
 "New Kehoe NJ" – 1:36
 "Close Map" – 2:38
 "No More (Again)" – 1:43
 "Summer Is Coming" – 4:03
 "A Well of Tires" – 2:53
 "A Million Middle Fingers" – 2:00
 "Promise the Party" – 3:23
 "Athabasca" – 3:42

References

2002 albums
Matt Pond PA albums
Polyvinyl Record Co. albums